Mussa is a genus of stony coral in the family Faviidae. It is monotypic, being represented by the single species Mussa angulosa, commonly known as the spiny or large flower coral. It is found on reefs in shallow waters in the Caribbean Sea, the Bahamas and the Gulf of Mexico.

Description
The corallites are phaceloid, that is they have a tubular form growing from a common base, in series of one to three, or occasionally up to five. There are four cycles of septa in each corallite, nearly equal in size; they are narrow and curved, with wide spacing. They completely obscure the short branches of the stony skeleton on which they occur. During the day the polyps appear fleshy, but during the night they expand further and each is fringed by a rim of short tentacles. The colour of the polyps is variable, being grey or pale brown with green, pink and purple shades. The tissues of this coral contain symbiotic single-celled algae called zooxanthellae. These are photosynthetic and absorb energy from the sun to create organic compounds which are used by the coral.

Distribution
Mussa angulosa occurs in the Caribbean Sea, the Gulf of Mexico and the Bahamas, and on reefs and banks off the coast of Texas and southern Florida.

Biology
Mussa angulosa is a reef-building species and is aggressive, attacking other fast-growing corals that start to grow close by and threaten to overgrow it or shade it. Its cnidocytes are so powerful that no other Caribbean corals can successfully attack it. It leans away from the current as it grows and reacts adversely to increased sedimentation.

Status
There are no specific threats facing this coral and the IUCN Red List of Threatened Species lists it as being near threatened. It is however probably declining because of the degradation of coral reefs by mechanical damage, climate change and ocean acidification. It is susceptible to coral bleaching and the coral diseases that affect stressed corals. Off the coasts of the United States it is present in various marine parks and other conservation areas, in both of which it is protected.

References

Mussinae
Corals described in 1766